Esteban López (born 28 February 1974) is a Colombian former cyclist. He competed in the team pursuit at the 1992 Summer Olympics.

References

1974 births
Living people
Colombian male cyclists
Olympic cyclists of Colombia
Cyclists at the 1992 Summer Olympics
Place of birth missing (living people)